The equipment of the Royal Brunei Police Force (RBPF) can be subdivided into: weapons and vehicles.

Vehicles

Ground vehicles

Watercrafts

Firearms

Historic equipment 
 Land Rover Defender
 Honda Super Cub

References

Brunei